The Black Mouth Cur, also known as the Southern Cur, Southern Black Mouth Cur and the Yellow Black Mouth Cur, is a medium to large sized breed of cur-type dog from the United States. Originating in the south of the country, the breed is a popular hunting companion used to hunt a large variety of game.

History
The Black Mouth Cur's origins are in the Southern United States where it is known by a number of names including the Southern Cur, Southern Black Mouth Cur and the Yellow Black Mouth Cur. There are a number of stories about the breed's ancestry, the most commonly held story is the breed descends from dogs brought to southern Mississippi by European settlers, among these progenitor European dogs included Belgian Malinois. In this environment these dogs were bred into their current form as a popular cur-type hunting dog, and from Mississippi they spread to the mountains of Tennessee, Missouri and North Carolina and eventually into the Big Thicket region of Southeast Texas. It is claimed the title character in Fred Gipson's novel Old Yeller was a Black Mouth Cur. In 1987 a breed club was formed to support the breed, the Southern Black Mouth Cur Breeders Association, and in 1998 the breed was recognised by the United Kennel Club.

Description

Appearance
The Black Mouth Cur is a medium to large sized, athletic, muscular breed of dog. The Black Mouth Cur has a short, dense coat that is typically yellow, fawn or light brown in color, although dark brown, brindle and black individual animals are known. The breed's head is broad and flat, they have drooped ears and a powerful, distinctively melanistic black muzzle. They have a broad chest, long legs and a long tail that is typically left undocked.

Character
The Black Mouth Cur is an extremely active breed which requires a great deal of exercise. The breed is wary of strangers and known to be very protective of children, sometimes to the point of objecting to parents disciplining their children. Many are known to respond better to female handlers.

Uses
The Black Mouth Cur is used extensively for hunting throughout the Southern United States, the breed is also used as a herding dog. The breed is used to hunt a broad variety of game including bear, feral pig, raccoon, deer and squirrel; the breed has a reputation as a voracious hunter that usually catches and kills game on the ground, although it does tree and bay game as well.

See also
 Carolina Dog
 Feist
 Lurcher
 Dogs portal
 List of dog breeds

References

External links 
 

Curs
Dog breeds originating in the United States